The men's Keirin at the 2008 Summer Olympics took place on August 16 at the Laoshan Velodrome.

This track cycling event consisted of multiple rounds. In each race, the four to seven cyclists in the heat covered 8 laps of the track. The first 5.5 laps were behind a motorized pacer called a derny, which gradually increased speed up to 50 kilometres per hour. The derny then left the track and the cyclists then raced the final 2.5 laps to the finish.

In the first round, four heats were held. The top two cyclists in each heat advanced to the semifinals, with the rest of the cyclists competing again in the repechage. Four of those cyclists advanced from the repechage to the semifinals as well, for a total of 12 semifinalists. They raced again in two semifinals heats. The top three cyclists in each semifinal advanced to the final, while the bottom three competed in the 7th to 12th place classification race.

Qualification 
Twenty-five cyclists competed in the Keirin. Chris Hoy (Great Britain) qualified directly by winning the Keirin at the 2008 UCI Track Cycling World Championships. He also won the event at the late 2007 World Cup event in Sydney, affording another position to qualifiers based on Union Cycliste Internationale (UCI) rankings.

Results
REL=Relegated, DNF=Did not finish, DNS=Did not start

Preliminaries 

Heat 1

Heat 2

Heat 3

Heat 4

Repechage 

Heat 1

Heat 2

Heat 3

Heat 4

Semifinals 

Heat 1

Heat 2

Finals 

Classification race

Medals race

References

Track cycling at the 2008 Summer Olympics
Cycling at the Summer Olympics – Men's keirin
Men's events at the 2008 Summer Olympics